The Dahshur boats are a group of ancient Egyptian funeral boats, originally numbering five or six, discovered near the funerary complex of the 12th Dynasty pharaoh Senusret III.

Excavation 
The boats were found during excavations on the plain of Dahshur in 1894 and 1895 by French archaeologist Jacques de Morgan. His original excavation report recorded six boats; however, later reports by de Morgan stated there were only five. The boats fell into obscurity until two of the boats were studied in the mid-1980s. As of 2022, the locations of only four of the boats are known; The Carnegie boat and the Chicago boat are in the United States, located in the Carnegie Museum of Natural History in Pittsburgh, and the Field Museum of Natural History in Chicago, respectively. The Red boat and the White boat were on display in the Cairo Museum, but were later relocated to the Sharm El-Sheikh Museum.

Characteristics  

They were once vibrantly painted, with white decks and either green or yellow hulls.

Construction techniques 
All four of the boats currently exhibit dovetail joints between planks. Dovetail joints are commonly seen in ancient Egyptian furniture, and other wooden objects, such as coffins, but have rarely been observed on watercraft. More commonly, Egyptian boats used a system of rope lashings and mortise and tenon joints, which helped to keep the hull planks from separating under stress. The only places this is visible on the Dahshur boats, are the bow, stern, and the uppermost strake. Dovetail joints were also present on sledges found near the boats. A theory has been proposed stating the dovetail joints found on the boats are instead simply lashing cuts that were modified after the boats excavation. However, in 2006, excavations at the 12th Dynasty port of Wadi Gawasis claim to have uncovered boat timbers that employed dovetail joints in the same way as the Dahshur boats.

Function 

The boats are thought to have been used to carry the body of the Senusret III down the Nile, and were then transported over land to his Pyramid by sledges. These sledges were found buried next to the boats during de Morgan's excavations.

Carnegie boat 
The Carnegie boat was donated to the Carnegie Museum of Natural History in 1901 by Andrew Carnegie. When he purchased the boat he did not tell the Museum Director, W.J. Holland. When the boat arrived, Holland told The Pittsburgh Times he “had not been in correspondence with anyone regarding such a relic.” It is on display in the Walton Hall of Ancient Egypt.

Chicago boat 
The Chicago boat was acquired by the Field Museum of Natural History in 1900, and has been on display in the museum since then.

Red boat and White boat
The Red boat and White boat were both given their names by de Morgan. However, they are officially known only by their General Catalogue numbers: GC 4926 for the Red boat and GC 4925 for the White boat. The boats were displayed in the Cairo Museum from 1910 to 2020, when they were relocated to the Sharm El-Sheikh Museum. During their move to the Sharm El-Sheikh Museum, the two boats were transported using a stainless steel chassis for easy movement and lifting.

Possible fifth boat 
The fate of the possible fifth boat described by de Morgan is unknown. It has been theorized that it was exported to a museum in Europe, or left in Dahshur. It may also have been destroyed by fire, with evidence of fire damage found on one of the other boats.

Images of the boats

See also
 Abydos boats
 Ancient Egyptian technology
 Khufu ship

References

External links 

 A Further Investigation of The Cairo Dahshur Boats

Dahshur
1894 archaeological discoveries
1895 archaeological discoveries
Ancient Egyptian ships
Ship burials
Senusret III
Ancient ships
Ships preserved in museums